This is a list of the mammal species recorded in Guyana. This list is derived from the IUCN Red List which lists species of mammals and includes those mammals that have recently been classified as extinct (since 1500 AD). The taxonomy and naming of the individual species is based on those used in existing Wikipedia articles as of 21 May 2007 and supplemented by the common names and taxonomy from the IUCN, Smithsonian Institution, or University of Michigan where no Wikipedia article was available.

The following tags are used to highlight each species' conservation status as assessed by the International Union for Conservation of Nature:

Some species were assessed using an earlier set of criteria. Species assessed using this system have the following instead of near threatened and least concern categories:

Subclass: Theria

Infraclass: Eutheria

Order: Sirenia (manatees and dugongs)

Sirenia is an order of fully aquatic, herbivorous mammals that inhabit rivers, estuaries, coastal marine waters, swamps, and marine wetlands.

Family: Trichechidae
Genus: Trichechus
 West Indian manatee, T. manatus

Order: Cingulata (armadillos)

The armadillos are small mammals with a bony armored shell. They are native to the Americas.

Family: Dasypodidae (armadillos)
Subfamily: Dasypodinae
Genus: Dasypus
 Greater long-nosed armadillo, Dasypus kappleri LC
 Nine-banded armadillo, Dasypus novemcinctus LC
Subfamily: Tolypeutinae
Genus: Cabassous
 Southern naked-tailed armadillo, Cabassous unicinctus LC
Genus: Priodontes
 Giant armadillo, Priodontes maximus VU

Order: Pilosa (anteaters, sloths and tamanduas)

The order Pilosa is extant only in the Americas and includes the anteaters, sloths, and tamanduas.

Suborder: Folivora
Family: Bradypodidae (three-toed sloths)
Genus: Bradypus
 Pale-throated three-toed sloth, Bradypus tridactylus LC
Family: Choloepodidae (two-toed sloths)
Genus: Choloepus
 Linnaeus's two-toed sloth, Choloepus didactylus LC
Suborder: Vermilingua
Family: Cyclopedidae
Genus: Cyclopes
 Silky anteater, Cyclopes didactylus LC
Family: Myrmecophagidae (American anteaters)
Genus: Myrmecophaga
 Giant anteater, Myrmecophaga tridactyla NT
Genus: Tamandua
 Southern tamandua, Tamandua tetradactyla LC

Order: Primates

The order Primates contains humans and their closest relatives: lemurs, lorisoids, monkeys, and apes.

Suborder: Haplorhini
Infraorder: Simiiformes
Parvorder: Platyrrhini (New World monkeys)
Family: Cebidae
Subfamily: Callitrichinae
Genus: Saguinus
 Red-handed tamarin, Saguinus midas LC
Subfamily: Cebinae
Genus: Cebus
 Tufted capuchin, Cebus apella LC
 Weeper capuchin, Cebus olivaceus LC
Genus: Saimiri
 Guianan squirrel monkey, Saimiri sciureus LC
Family: Pitheciidae
Subfamily: Pitheciinae
Genus: Pithecia
 White-faced saki, Pithecia pithecia LC
Genus: Chiropotes
 Red-backed bearded saki, Chiropotes chiropotes LC
Family: Atelidae
Subfamily: Atelinae
Genus: Ateles
 Red-faced spider monkey, Ateles paniscus LC
Genus: Alouatta
 Guyanan red howler, Alouatta macconnelli LC

Order: Rodentia (rodents)

Rodents make up the largest order of mammals, with over 40% of mammalian species. They have two incisors in the upper and lower jaw which grow continually and must be kept short by gnawing.

Suborder: Hystricognathi
Family: Erethizontidae (New World porcupines)
Subfamily: Erethizontinae
Genus: Coendou
 Brazilian porcupine, Coendou prehensilis LR/lc
Family: Caviidae (guinea pigs)
Subfamily: Caviinae
Genus: Cavia
 Brazilian guinea pig, Cavia aperea LR/lc
 Guinea pig, Cavia porcellus LR/lc
Subfamily: Hydrochoerinae (capybaras and rock cavies)
Genus: Hydrochoerus
 Capybara, Hydrochoerus hydrochaeris LR/lc
Family: Dasyproctidae (agoutis and pacas)
Genus: Dasyprocta
 Black agouti, Dasyprocta fuliginosa LR/lc
 Red-rumped agouti, Dasyprocta leporina LR/lc
Genus: Myoprocta
 Red acouchi, Myoprocta acouchy LR/lc
Family: Cuniculidae
Genus: Cuniculus
 Lowland paca, Cuniculus paca LC
Family: Echimyidae
Subfamily: Echimyinae
Genus: Isothrix
 Sinnamary brush-tailed rat, Isothrix sinnamariensis DD
Genus: Makalata
 Brazilian spiny tree-rat, Makalata armata LR/lc
Subfamily: Eumysopinae
Genus: Mesomys
 Ferreira's spiny tree rat, Mesomys hispidus LR/lc
Genus: Proechimys
 Guyenne spiny rat, Proechimys cayennensis LR/lc
 Cuvier's spiny rat, Proechimys cuvieri LR/lc
 Guyanan spiny rat, Proechimys hoplomyoides LR/lc
Suborder: Sciurognathi
Family: Sciuridae (squirrels)
Subfamily: Sciurinae
Tribe: Sciurini
Genus: Sciurus
 Brazilian squirrel, Sciurus aestuans LR/lc
 Yellow-throated squirrel, Sciurus gilvigularis LR/lc
Family: Cricetidae
Subfamily: Sigmodontinae
Genus: Holochilus
 Amazonian marsh rat, Holochilus sciureus LR/lc
Genus: Neacomys
 Guiana bristly mouse, Neacomys guianae LR/lc
 Common bristly mouse, Neacomys spinosus LR/lc
Genus: Neusticomys
 Venezuelan fish-eating rat, Neusticomys venezuelae EN
Genus: Oecomys
 Bicolored arboreal rice rat, Oecomys bicolor LR/lc
 Brazilian arboreal rice rat, Oecomys paricola LR/lc
 King arboreal rice rat, Oecomys rex LR/lc
 Robert's arboreal rice rat, Oecomys roberti LR/lc
 Red arboreal rice rat, Oecomys rutilus LR/lc
 Trinidad arboreal rice rat, Oecomys trinitatis LR/lc
Genus: Oligoryzomys
 Fulvous pygmy rice rat, Oligoryzomys fulvescens LR/lc
Genus: Oryzomys
 Azara's broad-headed rice rat, Oryzomys megacephalus LR/lc
 Yungas rice rat, Oryzomys yunganus LR/lc
Genus: Podoxymys
 Roraima mouse, Podoxymys roraimae LR/nt
Genus: Rhipidomys
 White-footed climbing mouse, Rhipidomys leucodactylus LR/lc
 MacConnell's climbing mouse, Rhipidomys macconnelli LR/lc
 Splendid climbing mouse, Rhipidomys nitela LR/lc
Genus: Sigmodon
 Alston's cotton rat, Sigmodon alstoni LR/lc
Genus: Zygodontomys
 Short-tailed cane rat, Zygodontomys brevicauda LR/lc

Order: Lagomorpha (lagomorphs)

The lagomorphs comprise two families, Leporidae (hares and rabbits), and Ochotonidae (pikas). Though they can resemble rodents, and were classified as a superfamily in that order until the early 20th century, they have since been considered a separate order. They differ from rodents in a number of physical characteristics, such as having four incisors in the upper jaw rather than two.

Family: Leporidae (rabbits, hares)
Genus: Sylvilagus
 Common tapetí, Sylvilagus brasiliensis EN
Suriname tapetí, Sylvilagus parentum NE

Order: Chiroptera (bats)

The bats' most distinguishing feature is that their forelimbs are developed as wings, making them the only mammals capable of flight. Bat species account for about 20% of all mammals.

Family: Noctilionidae
Genus: Noctilio
 Lesser bulldog bat, Noctilio albiventris LR/lc
 Greater bulldog bat, Noctilio leporinus LR/lc
Family: Vespertilionidae
Subfamily: Myotinae
Genus: Myotis
 Silver-tipped myotis, Myotis albescens LR/lc
 Black myotis, Myotis nigricans LR/lc
 Riparian myotis, Myotis riparius LR/lc
Subfamily: Vespertilioninae
Genus: Eptesicus
 Brazilian brown bat, Eptesicus brasiliensis LR/lc
 Argentine brown bat, Eptesicus furinalis LR/lc
Genus: Lasiurus
 Greater red bat, Lasiurus atratus DD
 Desert red bat, Lasiurus blossevillii LR/lc
 Southern yellow bat, Lasiurus ega LR/lc
Family: Molossidae
Genus: Cynomops
 Cinnamon dog-faced bat, Cynomops abrasus LR/nt
 Greenhall's dog-faced bat, Cynomops greenhalli LR/lc
 Southern dog-faced bat, Cynomops planirostris LR/lc
Genus: Eumops
 Dwarf bonneted bat, Eumops bonariensis LR/lc
 Wagner's bonneted bat, Eumops glaucinus LR/lc
 Sanborn's bonneted bat, Eumops hansae LR/lc
 Guianan bonneted bat, Eumops maurus VU
 Western mastiff bat, Eumops perotis LR/lc
Genus: Molossops
 Mato Grosso dog-faced bat, Molossops mattogrossensis LR/nt
Genus: Molossus
 Black mastiff bat, Molossus ater LR/lc
 Velvety free-tailed bat, Molossus molossus LR/lc
 Miller's mastiff bat, Molossus pretiosus LR/lc
 Sinaloan mastiff bat, Molossus sinaloae LR/lc
Genus: Nyctinomops
 Peale's free-tailed bat, Nyctinomops aurispinosus LR/lc
 Broad-eared bat, Nyctinomops laticaudatus LR/lc
 Big free-tailed bat, Nyctinomops macrotis LR/lc
Genus: Promops
 Big crested mastiff bat, Promops centralis LR/lc
Family: Emballonuridae
Genus: Centronycteris
 Shaggy bat, Centronycteris maximiliani LR/lc
Genus: Cormura
 Wagner's sac-winged bat, Cormura brevirostris LR/lc
Genus: Cyttarops
 Short-eared bat, Cyttarops alecto LR/nt
Genus: Diclidurus
 Northern ghost bat, Diclidurus albus LR/lc
 Greater ghost bat, Diclidurus ingens VU
 Isabelle's ghost bat, Diclidurus isabella LR/nt
 Lesser ghost bat, Diclidurus scutatus LR/lc
Genus: Peropteryx
 Greater dog-like bat, Peropteryx kappleri LR/lc
 White-winged dog-like bat, Peropteryx leucoptera LR/lc
Genus: Rhynchonycteris
 Proboscis bat, Rhynchonycteris naso LR/lc
Genus: Saccopteryx
 Greater sac-winged bat, Saccopteryx bilineata LR/lc
 Frosted sac-winged bat, Saccopteryx canescens LR/lc
 Lesser sac-winged bat, Saccopteryx leptura LR/lc
Family: Mormoopidae
Genus: Pteronotus
 Naked-backed bat, Pteronotus davyi LR/lc
 Big naked-backed bat, Pteronotus gymnonotus LR/lc
 Parnell's mustached bat, Pteronotus parnellii LR/lc
 Wagner's mustached bat, Pteronotus personatus LR/lc
Family: Phyllostomidae
Subfamily: Phyllostominae
Genus: Glyphonycteris
 Davies's big-eared bat, Glyphonycteris daviesi LR/nt
Genus: Lampronycteris
 Yellow-throated big-eared bat, Lampronycteris brachyotis LR/lc
Genus: Lonchorhina
 Tomes's sword-nosed bat, Lonchorhina aurita LR/lc
Genus: Lophostoma
 Pygmy round-eared bat, Lophostoma brasiliense LR/lc
 Carriker's round-eared bat, Lophostoma carrikeri VU
 Schultz's round-eared bat, Lophostoma schulzi VU
 White-throated round-eared bat, Lophostoma silvicolum LR/lc
Genus: Macrophyllum
 Long-legged bat, Macrophyllum macrophyllum LR/lc
Genus: Micronycteris
 Brosset's big-eared bat, Micronycteris brosseti DD
 Hairy big-eared bat, Micronycteris hirsuta LR/lc
 Little big-eared bat, Micronycteris megalotis LR/lc
 White-bellied big-eared bat, Micronycteris minuta LR/lc
Genus: Mimon
 Golden bat, Mimon bennettii LR/lc
 Striped hairy-nosed bat, Mimon crenulatum LR/lc
Genus: Phylloderma
 Pale-faced bat, Phylloderma stenops LR/lc
Genus: Phyllostomus
 Pale spear-nosed bat, Phyllostomus discolor LR/lc
 Lesser spear-nosed bat, Phyllostomus elongatus LR/lc
 Greater spear-nosed bat, Phyllostomus hastatus LR/lc
Genus: Tonatia
 Stripe-headed round-eared bat, Tonatia saurophila LR/lc
Genus: Trachops
 Fringe-lipped bat, Trachops cirrhosus LR/lc
Genus: Trinycteris
 Niceforo's big-eared bat, Trinycteris nicefori LR/lc
Genus: Vampyrum
 Spectral bat, Vampyrum spectrum LR/nt
Subfamily: Lonchophyllinae
Genus: Lionycteris
 Chestnut long-tongued bat, Lionycteris spurrelli LR/lc
Genus: Lonchophylla
 Thomas's nectar bat, Lonchophylla thomasi LR/lc
Subfamily: Glossophaginae
Genus: Anoura
 Tailed tailless bat, Anoura caudifer LR/lc
 Geoffroy's tailless bat, Anoura geoffroyi LR/lc
Genus: Choeroniscus
 Godman's long-tailed bat, Choeroniscus godmani LR/nt
 Minor long-nosed long-tongued bat, Choeroniscus minor LR/lc
Genus: Glossophaga
 Miller's long-tongued bat, Glossophaga longirostris LR/lc
 Pallas's long-tongued bat, Glossophaga soricina LR/lc
Genus: Lichonycteris
 Dark long-tongued bat, Lichonycteris obscura LR/lc
Subfamily: Carolliinae
Genus: Carollia
 Chestnut short-tailed bat, Carollia castanea LR/lc
 Seba's short-tailed bat, Carollia perspicillata LR/lc
Genus: Rhinophylla
 Dwarf little fruit bat, Rhinophylla pumilio LR/lc
Subfamily: Stenodermatinae
Genus: Ametrida
 Little white-shouldered bat, Ametrida centurio LR/lc
Genus: Artibeus
 Large fruit-eating bat, Artibeus amplus LR/nt
 Gervais's fruit-eating bat, Artibeus cinereus LR/lc
 Silver fruit-eating bat, Artibeus glaucus LR/lc
 Jamaican fruit bat, Artibeus jamaicensis LR/lc
 Great fruit-eating bat, Artibeus lituratus LR/lc
 Pygmy fruit-eating bat, Artibeus phaeotis LR/lc
Genus: Chiroderma
 Little big-eyed bat, Chiroderma trinitatum LR/lc
 Hairy big-eyed bat, Chiroderma villosum LR/lc
Genus: Mesophylla
 MacConnell's bat, Mesophylla macconnelli LR/lc
Genus: Sturnira
 Little yellow-shouldered bat, Sturnira lilium LR/lc
 Highland yellow-shouldered bat, Sturnira ludovici LR/lc
 Tilda's yellow-shouldered bat, Sturnira tildae LR/lc
Genus: Uroderma
 Tent-making bat, Uroderma bilobatum LR/lc
 Brown tent-making bat, Uroderma magnirostrum LR/lc
Genus: Vampyressa
 Bidentate yellow-eared bat, Vampyressa bidens LR/nt
 Brock's yellow-eared bat, Vampyressa brocki LR/nt
Genus: Vampyrodes
 Great stripe-faced bat, Vampyrodes caraccioli LR/lc
Genus: Platyrrhinus
 Short-headed broad-nosed bat, Platyrrhinus brachycephalus LR/lc
 Heller's broad-nosed bat, Platyrrhinus helleri LR/lc
Subfamily: Desmodontinae
Genus: Diaemus
 White-winged vampire bat, Diaemus youngi LR/lc
Family: Furipteridae
Genus: Furipterus
 Thumbless bat, Furipterus horrens LR/lc
Family: Thyropteridae
Genus: Thyroptera
 Peters's disk-winged bat, Thyroptera discifera LR/lc
 Spix's disk-winged bat, Thyroptera tricolor LR/lc

Order: Cetacea (whales)

The order Cetacea includes whales, dolphins and porpoises. They are the mammals most fully adapted to aquatic life with a spindle-shaped nearly hairless body, protected by a thick layer of blubber, and forelimbs and tail modified to provide propulsion underwater.

Suborder: Mysticeti 
Superfamily: Balaenopteroidea
Family: Balaenopteridae
Genus: Balaenoptera
Common minke whale, Balaenoptera acutorostrata
Sei whale, Balaenoptera borealis
Bryde's whale, Balaenoptera brydei
Blue whale, Balaenoptera musculus
Fin whale, Balaenoptera physalus
Genus: Megaptera
Humpback whale, Megaptera novaeangliae
Suborder: Odontoceti
Superfamily: Platanistoidea
Family: Iniidae
Genus: Inia
 Boto, Inia geoffrensis VU
Family: Ziphidae
Subfamily: Ziphiinae
Genus: Ziphius
 Cuvier's beaked whale, Ziphius cavirostris DD
Subfamily: Hyperoodontinae
Genus: Mesoplodon
 Blainville's beaked whale, Mesoplodon densirostris DD
 Gervais' beaked whale, Mesoplodon europaeus DD
Family: Delphinidae (marine dolphins)
Genus: Steno
 Rough-toothed dolphin, Steno bredanensis DD
Genus: Sotalia
 Costero, Sotalia guianensis DD
Genus: Stenella
 Atlantic spotted dolphin, Stenella frontalis DD
 Pantropical spotted dolphin, Stenella attenuata LR/cd
 Clymene dolphin, Stenella clymene DD
 Striped dolphin, Stenella coeruleoalba LR/cd
 Spinner dolphin, Stenella longirostris DD
Genus: Tursiops
 Common bottlenose dolphin, Tursiops truncatus LR/lc
Genus: Delphinus
 Long-beaked common dolphin, Delphinus capensis LR/lc
Genus: Lagenodelphis
 Fraser's dolphin, Lagenodelphis hosei DD
Genus: Feresa
 Pygmy killer whale, Feresa attenuata DD
Genus: Globicephala
 Short-finned pilot whale, Globicephala macrorhynchus DD
Genus: Orcinus
 Killer whale, Orcinus orca DD
Genus: Peponocephala
 Melon-headed whale, Peponocephala electra DD
Genus: Pseudorca
 False killer whale, Pseudorca crassidens DD
Family: Physeteridae
Genus: Physeter
 Sperm whale, Physeter macrocephalus VU
Family: Kogiidae
Genus: Kogia
 Pygmy sperm whale, Kogia breviceps DD
 Dwarf sperm whale, Kogia sima DD

Order: Carnivora (carnivorans)

There are over 260 species of carnivorans, the majority of which feed primarily on meat. They have a characteristic skull shape and dentition. 
Suborder: Feliformia
Family: Felidae (cats)
Subfamily: Felinae
Genus: Herpailurus
Jaguarundi, H. yagouaroundi 
Genus: Leopardus
Ocelot L. pardalis 
Oncilla L. tigrinus 
Margay L. wiedii 
Genus: Puma
Cougar, P. concolor 
Subfamily: Pantherinae
Genus: Panthera
Jaguar, P. onca 
Family: Herpestidae
Genus: Urva
 Small Indian mongoose, U. auropunctata  introduced
Suborder: Caniformia
Family: Canidae (dogs, foxes)
Genus: Cerdocyon
 Crab-eating fox, Cerdocyon thous LC
Genus: Speothos
 Bush dog, Speothos venaticus VU
Family: Procyonidae (raccoons)
Genus: Procyon
 Crab-eating raccoon, Procyon cancrivorus
Genus: Nasua
 South American coati, Nasua nasua
Genus: Potos
 Kinkajou, Potos flavus
Genus: Bassaricyon
 Eastern lowland olingo, Bassaricyon alleni
Family: Mustelidae (mustelids)
Genus: Eira
 Tayra, Eira barbara
Genus: Galictis
 Greater grison, Galictis vittata
Genus: Lontra
 Neotropical river otter, Lontra longicaudis DD
Genus: Neogale
 Long-tailed weasel, Neogale frenata
Genus: Pteronura
 Giant otter, Pteronura brasiliensis EN
Family: Mephitidae
Genus: Conepatus
 Striped hog-nosed skunk, Conepatus semistriatus

Order: Perissodactyla (odd-toed ungulates)

The odd-toed ungulates are browsing and grazing mammals. They are usually large to very large, and have relatively simple stomachs and a large middle toe.

Family: Tapiridae (tapirs)
Genus: Tapirus
 Brazilian tapir, Tapirus terrestris VU

Order: Artiodactyla (even-toed ungulates)

The even-toed ungulates are ungulates whose weight is borne about equally by the third and fourth toes, rather than mostly or entirely by the third as in perissodactyls.

Family: Tayassuidae (peccaries)
Genus: Dicotyles
 Collared peccary, D. tajacu LC
Genus: Tayassu
 White-lipped peccary, Tayassu pecari NT
Family: Cervidae (deer)
Subfamily: Capreolinae
Genus: Mazama
 Red brocket, Mazama americana DD
 Gray brocket, Mazama gouazoupira DD
Genus: Odocoileus
 White-tailed deer, Odocoileus virginianus LR/lc

Infraclass: Metatheria

Order: Didelphimorphia (common opossums)

Didelphimorphia is the order of common opossums of the Western Hemisphere. Opossums probably diverged from the basic South American marsupials in the late Cretaceous or early Paleocene. They are small to medium-sized marsupials, about the size of a large house cat, with a long snout and prehensile tail.

Family: Didelphidae (American opossums)
Subfamily: Caluromyinae
Genus: Caluromys
 Bare-tailed woolly opossum, Caluromys philander LR/nt
Subfamily: Didelphinae
Genus: Chironectes
 Water opossum, Chironectes minimus LR/nt
Genus: Didelphis
 White-eared opossum, Didelphis albiventris LR/lc
 Common opossum, Didelphis marsupialis LR/lc
Genus: Hyladelphys
 Kalinowski's mouse opossum, Hyladelphys kalinowskii DD
Genus: Lutreolina
 Big lutrine opossum, Lutreolina crassicaudata LR/lc
Genus: Marmosa
 Woolly mouse opossum, Marmosa demerarae LR/lc
 Linnaeus's mouse opossum, Marmosa murina LR/lc
Genus: Marmosops
 Delicate slender opossum, Marmosops parvidens LR/nt
Genus: Metachirus
 Brown four-eyed opossum, Metachirus nudicaudatus LR/lc
Genus: Philander
 Gray four-eyed opossum, Philander opossum LR/lc

See also
List of chordate orders
Lists of mammals by region
List of prehistoric mammals
Mammal classification
List of mammals described in the 2000s

References

External links

Guyana
Mammals

Guyana